North Talwood is a rural locality in the Goondiwindi Region, Queensland, Australia.

Geography
Talwood is a town at the southern edge of the locality immediately north of the boundary of South Talwood.

North Talwood is mostly bounded to the south by the South-Western railway line, which enters the locality from the south-east (South Talwood / Bungunya) and exits to the south-west (South Talwood / Weengallon). The locality is served by Talwood railway station in the town.

The Barwon Highway enters the locality in the south-east (Bungunya), passes through the town, and exits to the west (Weengallon).

History
The name Talwood comes from the town, which was named from the Dalwood run name, which in turn was named in 1844, probably a corruption of an Aboriginal language word. Historically it is sometimes written as Tallwood.

Education 
Talwood State School is a government primary (Prep-6) school for boys and girls at 17 Recreation Street. In 2018, the school had an enrolment of 28 students with 4 teachers (3 full-time equivalent) and 5 non-teaching staff (2 full-time equivalent).

The nearest government secondary school is Goondiwindi State High School in Goondiwindi to the east.

References 

Goondiwindi Region
Localities in Queensland